Glipidiomorpha leucozona is a species of beetle in the genus Glipidiomorpha of the family Mordellidae. It was described in 1952 by Francisco.

References

Beetles described in 1952
Mordellidae